Epworth railway station was a station that served the town of Epworth, on the Isle of Axholme in Lincolnshire, England.

References

Disused railway stations in the Borough of North Lincolnshire
Former Axholme Joint Railway stations
Railway stations in Great Britain opened in 1905
Railway stations in Great Britain closed in 1933
Epworth, Lincolnshire